Benjamin Shapiro (born 1959) is an American documentary director, cinematographer, and independent public radio producer.

Film and television 

Shapiro is producer, director, and cinematographer of the documentary Gregory Crewdson: Brief Encounters, which follows the photographer over a decade as he creates his images. Brief Encounters premiered at the South by Southwest Film Festival and is screening theatrically at festivals and on television internationally. The New York Times rated the film as a "Critics' Pick," and Variety described it as "must see."

Shapiro’s work as a cinematographer and producer includes projects for PBS (American Masters, PBS Arts, EGG), National Geographic, The Sundance Channel, and independent filmmakers including Katy Chevigny, Barbara Kopple, the feature “Paul Goodman Changed my Life,” among others.

Radio 

Shapiro’s radio stories have been featured on such programs as NPR’s All Things Considered and Morning Edition. He has been a member of Radio Diaries since the series began in 1996, as an editor, mix engineer, and producer. Shapiro has collaborated on projects with many producers including American Radioworks, The Kitchen Sisters, WNYC and the BBC.

Awards 

For his work, Shapiro has received an Emmy award, two Peabody Awards, and two Dupont Awards.

Teaching and publications 

Shapiro has been published in the Journal of Popular Film and Television and Transom.org. He has taught at the Columbia Graduate School of Journalism, the New School University Graduate Media Studies program, and the Center For Documentary Studies at Duke University.

Footnotes

1959 births
Living people
American film directors
Place of birth missing (living people)
University of Texas at Austin alumni